The third season of the American comedy television series Scrubs premiered on NBC on October 2, 2003, and concluded on May 4, 2004, and consists of 22 episodes. This season features many fantasies, as well as features many well-known actors in guest roles such as Scott Foley, Michael J. Fox, Bellamy Young, Brendan Fraser, and Tara Reid.

It is J.D., Elliot, and Turk's third year at Sacred Heart and second year as residents. As the season opens, Elliot decides to change her image, with some help from the Janitor. J.D.'s undeniable crush on Elliot emerges again, but J.D. instead begins a relationship with Jordan's sister Danni (Tara Reid), who is also dealing with feelings for her ex. Turk and Carla are engaged and planning their wedding. Turk, along with the Todd and the other surgical residents, deal with the new attending surgeon, Dr. Grace Miller (Bellamy Young), who dislikes Turk and considers him sexist. Dr. Cox and Jordan are doing well with their relationship and their son Jack, although Dr. Cox develops a schoolboy crush on Dr. Miller. He also struggles with the death of his best friend. Elliot gets into a serious relationship with Sean Kelly (Scott Foley) and tries to work out their long-distance relationship while he is in New Zealand for six months.

Cast and characters

Main cast
Zach Braff as Dr. John "J.D." Dorian
Sarah Chalke as Dr. Elliot Reid
Donald Faison as Dr. Chris Turk
Neil Flynn as The Janitor
Ken Jenkins as Dr. Bob Kelso
John C. McGinley as Dr. Perry Cox
Judy Reyes as Nurse Carla Espinosa

Recurring roles
Aloma Wright as Nurse Laverne Roberts
Robert Maschio as Dr. Todd Quinlan
Christa Miller as Jordan Sullivan
Tara Reid as Danni Sullivan
Scott Foley as Sean Kelly
Sam Lloyd as Ted Buckland
Johnny Kastl as Dr. Doug Murphy
Bellamy Young as Dr. Grace Miller
Martin Klebba as Randall Winston

Guest stars

Freddy Rodriguez as Marco Espinosa
Michael J. Fox as Dr. Kevin Casey
Barry Bostwick as Mr. Randolph
Néstor Carbonell as Dr. Ron Ramirez
Tom Cavanagh as Dan Dorian
Alexander Chaplin as Sam Thompson
Embeth Davidtz as Maddie
Brendan Fraser as Ben Sullivan
Richard Kind as Harvey Corman
Christopher Meloni as Dr. Dave Norris
Nicole Sullivan as Jill Tracy
George Takei as Priest
The Polyphonic Spree as themselves
The Blanks as the Worthless Peons

Production
Rich Eustis was hired as a consultant for this season. In addition, Justin Spitzer wrote a spec script that was made into an episode.

Writing staff
Bill Lawrence – executive producer/head writer
Eric Weinberg – co-executive producer
Matt Tarses – co-executive producer
Tim Hobert – co-executive producer
Neil Goldman and Garrett Donovan – supervising producers
Gabrielle Allan – supervising producer
Mike Schwartz – co-producer
Debra Fordham – executive story editor
Mark Stegemann – executive story editor
Janae Bakken – executive story editor
Angela Nissel – story editor
Rich Eustis – consultant

Production staff
Bill Lawrence – executive producer/showrunner
Randall Winston – producer
Liz Newman – co-producer
Danny Rose – associate producer

Directors
Includes directors who directed 2 or more episodes, or directors who are part of the cast and crew
Michael Spiller (3 episodes)
Chris Koch (3 episodes)
Bill Lawrence (2 episodes)
Ken Whittingham (2 episodes)
Adam Bernstein (2 episodes)
Gail Mancuso (2 episodes)
Craig Zisk (2 episodes)
Randall Winston (producer) (1 episode)
Richard Alexander Wells (assistant director)  (1 episode)
John Inwood (director of photography) (1 episode)

Episodes

"My Dirty Secret" was originally scheduled to be broadcast on October 16, 2003. However, the entire NBC lineup was pulled due to the Major League Baseball 2003 American League Championship Series on Fox going to a 7th game. The other NBC shows from that night (Friends, ER, and Will & Grace) all shifted their scheduled episodes to the following week. For reasons unknown, this episode was not shifted to the following week, and was broadcast out of order (with some small edits in an attempt to hide the inconsistencies, such as Sean being present, and J.D. being single).  This episode was broadcast in its original form and original order in some international markets.  Syndication also uses the original version.

Notes 
† denotes a "supersized" episode, running an extended length of 25–28 minutes.

References

General references

External links

 

 
2003 American television seasons
2004 American television seasons
3